Yoshio Yoshida may refer to:

, Japanese baseball player and manager
, Japanese World War II flying ace